The 13th Parliament of Sri Lanka was a meeting of the Parliament of Sri Lanka, with the membership determined by the results of the 2004 parliamentary election held on 2 April 2004. The parliament met for the first time on 22 April 2004 and was dissolved on 9 February 2010.

Election

The 13th parliamentary election was held on 2 April 2004. The United People's Freedom Alliance (UPFA), a newly formed opposition alliance, became the largest group in Parliament by winning 105 of the 225 seats. The incumbent United National Front (UNF) won 82 seats. The minority Tamil party Tamil National Alliance (TNA) won 22 seats. Smaller parties won the remaining 16 seats.

Results

The new parliament was sworn in on 22 April 2004. W. J. M. Lokubandara, the opposition's candidate, was elected Speaker after three dramatic rounds of voting in Parliament. The parliament reconvened on 18 May 2004 to elect unopposed Gitanjana Gunawardena as Deputy Speaker and M. Satchithanandan as the Deputy Chairman of Committees.

Government

The UPFA was able to form a minority government with the support of the sole Eelam People's Democratic Party MP.

On 6 April 2004, President Chandrika Kumaratunga appointed Mahinda Rajapaksa, the leader of the UPFA, as the new Prime Minister. The rest of the government, comprising 30 Ministers and 31 Deputy Ministers, were sworn in on 10 April 2004. President Kumaratunga retained control of the important ministries of Defence, Public Security, Law & Order, Highways, Education and Buddha Sasana.

After that a number of defections and counter-defections from the opposition increased the number of government MPs to 129, most of whom were rewarded with ministerial posts. This allowed the UPFA form a stable government for six years.

Following the expiration of the second term of President Kumaratunge, Prime Minister Mahinda Rajapakse defeated the leader of the United National Party and former Prime Minister Ranil Wickremasinghe in the 2005 Presidential election. He was succeeded as Prime Minister by Ratnasiri Wickremanayake.

By January 2007 the government had grown to 104 (52 Ministers + 33 Non-Cabinet Ministers + 19 Deputy Ministers). Only a handful of UPFA MPs didn't have a ministerial position. The government was labelled the "Jumbo Cabinet" due to the high number of ministers. It was the largest government in Sri Lanka's history and proportionally one of the largest in the world. By the end of the 13th Parliament the number of ministers had grown further to 109.

Changes in party/alliance affiliations
The 13th parliament saw a number of defections and counter-defections:

18 May 2004: One Sri Lanka Muslim Congress (SLMC) MP (Hussain Ahamed Bhaila) joins the UPFA.
9 August 2004: Two SLMC MPs (M. N. Abdul Majeed, Rishad Bathiudeen) join UPFA.
3 September 2004: Ceylon Workers' Congress (eight MPs) joins UPFA, giving it a majority in parliament.
16 June 2005: Janatha Vimukthi Peramuna (JVP) (39 MPs) quits UPFA.
14 December 2005: One CWC MP (Vadivel Suresh) joins UPFA.
25 January 2006: Two United National Party MPs (Keheliya Rambukwella, Mahinda Samarasinghe) join UPFA.
28 January 2007: 18 UNP MPs (Lakshman Yapa Abeywardena, Rohitha Bogollagama, P. Dayaratna, R. M. Dharmadasa Banda, Navin Dissanayake, Edward Gunaserkara, Bandula Gunawardane, Karu Jayasuriya, Gamini Lokuge, M. H. Mohamed, Milinda Moragoda, M. Mohamed Musthaffa, Hemakumara Nanayakkara, Neomal Perera, G. L. Peiris, Rajitha Senaratne, C. A. Suriyaarachchi, Mano Wijeyeratne, Mahinda Wijesekara) and 6 SLMC MPs join UPFA.
30 January 2007: Jathika Hela Urumaya (eight MPs) joins UPFA.
12 December 2007: Four SLMC MPs (Hasen Ali, Cassim Faizal, Rauff Hakeem, Basheer Segu Dawood) quit the UPFA.
28 December 2008: 12 MPs, who had left the JVP in May 2008 to form the National Freedom Front, join the UPFA.

Deaths and resignations
The 13th parliament saw numerous deaths and resignations:
18 April 2004: Kingsley Rasanayagam (TNA-BAT) resigned shortly after being elected (before being sworn in). His replacement Pakkiyaselvam Ariyanethiran (TNA-BAT) was sworn in on 18 May 2004.
23 April 2004: Mary Lucida (UPFA-NAT), Janadasa Peiris (UPFA-NAT) and E. A. D. C. Weerasekera (UPFA-NAT) resigned. Their replacements Mervyn Silva (UPFA-NAT), Ratnasiri Wickremanayake (UPFA-NAT) and Wijeyadasa Rajapakshe (UPFA-NAT) were sworn in on 18 May 2004.
9 May 2004: Kataluwe Ratanasiya (JHU-COL) resigned. His replacement Akmeemana Dayarathana (JHU-COL) was sworn in on 8 June 2008.
19 May 2004: W. P. S. Pushpakumara (UNF-NAT) resigned. His replacement Basheer Segu Dawood (UNF-NAT) was sworn in on 20 July 2004.
20 May 2004: Ismail Mohammed Quddus (UNF-NAT) resigned. His replacement S. Nijamudeen (UNF-NAT) was sworn in on 20 July 2004.
24 May 2004: Philipps Kumarasinghe Sri Liyanage (UPFA-NAT) resigned. His replacement Mohamed Mussammil (UPFA-NAT) was sworn in on 20 July 2004.
27 May 2004: Mahipala Herath (UPFA-KEG) resigned to contest the Sabaragamuwa provincial council elections. His replacement H. R. Mithrapala (UPFA-KEG) was sworn in on 20 July 2004.
28 May 2004: Reginald Cooray (UPFA-KAL) resigned to contest the Western provincial council elections. His replacement Nirmala Kotalawala (UPFA-KAL) was sworn in on 20 July 2004.
23 June 2004: Seyed Ali Zahir Moulana (UNF-NAT) resigned. His replacement M. Mohamed Musthaffa (UNF-NAT) was sworn in on 20 July 2004.
8 October 2004: Kolonnawe Sri Sumangala (JHU-GAM) resigned. His replacement was Alawwe Nandaloka (JHU-GAM).
7 December 2004: S. B. Dissanayake (UNF-NUW) vacated his seat after being jailed by the Sri Lankan Supreme Court for contempt of court. His replacement Renuka Herath (UNF-NUW) was sworn in on 30 January 2006.
12 August 2005: Lakshman Kadirgamar (UPFA-NAT) murdered. His replacement Dullas Alahapperuma (UPFA-NAT) was sworn in on 19 December 2005.
19 November 2005: Mahinda Rajapaksa (UPFA-HAM) resigned to take up presidency. His replacement Nirupama Rajapaksa (UPFA-HAM) was sworn in on 25 November 2005.
25 December 2005: Joseph Pararajasingham (TNA-NAT) murdered. His replacement Chandra Nehru Chandrakanthan was sworn in on 27 September 2006.
19 April 2006: Siripala Amarasingha (JVP-GAM) resigned. His replacement was Sarath Kumara Gunaratna (UPFA-GAM).
10 November 2006: Nadarajah Raviraj (TNA-JAF) murdered. His replacement Nallathamby Srikantha (TNA-JAF) was sworn in on 30 November 2006.
31 January 2007: Omalpe Sobhita (JHU-NAT) resigned. His replacement was Champika Ranawaka (JHU-NAT).
13 September 2007: Anwar Ismail (UPFA-NAT) died. His replacement Basil Rajapaksa (UPFA-NAT) was sworn in on 19 September 2007.
14 December 2007: M. K. Eelaventhan (TNA-NAT) vacated his seat due to non-attendance. His replacement Raseen Mohammed Imam (TNA-NAT) was sworn in on 5 February 2008.
1 January 2008: T. Maheswaran (UNF-COL) murdered. His replacement Mohamed Rajabdeen (UNF-COL) was sworn in on 8 January 2008.
8 January 2008: D. M. Dassanayake (UPF-PUT) murdered. His replacement Piyankara Jayaratne (UPFA-PUT) was sworn in on 5 February 2008.
9 February 2008: Sripathi Sooriyaarachchi (UPFA-GAM) killed. His replacement Reggie Ranatunga (UPFA-GAM) was sworn in on 21 February 2008.
6 March 2008: K. Sivanesan (TNA-JAF) murdered. His replacement Solomon Cyril (TNA-JAF) was sworn in on 9 April 2008.
16 March 2008: Anura Bandaranaike (UPFA-GAM) died. His replacement Sarana Gunawardena (UPFA-GAM) was sworn in on 6 May 2008.
2 April 2008: Hasen Ali (SLMC-NAT), Rauff Hakeem (SLMC-AMP) and Basheer Segu Dawood (UNF-NAT) resigned to contest the Eastern provincial council elections. Hakeem's replacement A. M. M. Naoshad (SLMC-AMP) was sworn in on 9 April 2008. Segu Dawood's replacement Rauff Hakeem (UNF-NAT) was sworn in on 10 July 2008. Ali replaced himself and was sworn in on 22 July 2008.
6 April 2008: Jeyaraj Fernandopulle (UPFA-GAM) murdered. His replacement Dulip Wijeysekara (UPFA-GAM) was sworn in on 6 May 2008.
31 May 2008: Reggie Ranatunga (UPFA-GAM) died. His replacement Neil Rupasinghe (UPFA-GAM) was sworn in on 6 June 2008.
30 June 2008: H. M. Wasantha Samarasinghe (JVP-NAT) resigned to contest the North Central provincial council elections. His replacement Vinayagamoorthy Muralitharan (UPFA-NAT) was sworn in on 7 October 2008.
3 September 2008: Anuruddha Polgampola (UPFA-KEG) resigned. His replacement Lalith Dissanayake (UPFA-KEG) was sworn in on 12 September 2008.
17 May 2009: Alick Aluvihare (UNF-MTL) died. His replacement Nandimithra Ekanayake (UNF-MTL) was sworn in on 9 June 2009.
21 May 2009: Kanagasabai Pathmanathan (TNA-AMP) died. His replacement Thomas Thangathurai William (TNA-AMP) was sworn in on 12 June 2009.
30 May 2009: Amarasiri Dodangoda (UPFA-GAL) died. His replacement Chandima Weerakkody (UPFA-GAL) was sworn in on 9 June 2009.
25 July 2009: Sarath Ranawaka (UNF-KAL) died. His replacement Ananda Lakshman Wijemanna (UNF-KAL) was sworn in on 6 August 2009.
1 January 2010: Periyasamy Chandrasekaran (UCPF-NUW) died. His replacement Santhanam Arulsamy (WLF-NUW) was sworn in on 5 February 2010.

Members

References

Parliament of Sri Lanka
2004 Sri Lankan parliamentary election